A Channel is a Japanese anime television series produced by Studio Gokumi based on the 4-panel manga series by bb Kuroda. It follows the daily lives of four friends, Tōru, Run, Yūko and Nagi. The twelve episode series aired in Japan between April 8, 2011 and June 24, 2011. Bonus +A Channel mini episodes were included on Blu-ray Disc and DVD volumes released between May 25, 2011 and October 26, 2011. Sentai Filmworks have licensed the series in North America. An original video animation titled A Channel + smile was released on March 21, 2012.

Each episode also features an insert song sung by the voice cast.

Episode list

A Channel

+A Channel

A Channel + smile

References

A Channel